Howard Lodge is a historic plantation house in north-central Howard County, Maryland. The main house, built around 1750 by Edward Dorsey, son of John Dorsey, is one of the oldest plantation houses in the county. Compared to other houses of the period, the two-story brick and stone structure is larger and its interior finishes better preserved. Edward Dorsey was given ownership of seven African-American slaves by his father John Dorsey.

The property was listed on the National Register of Historic Places in 2012.

See also
National Register of Historic Places listings in Howard County, Maryland
List of Howard County properties in the Maryland Historical Trust

References

External links
, including undated photo, at Maryland Historical Trust

African-American history of Howard County, Maryland
Houses completed in 1750
Georgian architecture in Maryland
Houses on the National Register of Historic Places in Maryland
Howard County, Maryland landmarks
Houses in Howard County, Maryland
Plantation houses in Maryland
Plantations in Maryland
National Register of Historic Places in Howard County, Maryland
Sykesville, Maryland